Matthew Benjamin Perez Lopez (born 1 March 1993) more popularly known as Matthew Lopez is a Filipino art researcher, independent curator, art advisor, and author. He is best known for his various writings on Philippine art and culture that have been published in various publications including the CCP Encyclopedia of Philippine Art.

Personal life and career 
He finished his primary education at the La Salle Greenhills in Manila and his secondary education at the Reedley International School Manila. Lopez later graduated with a bachelor's degree in political economy, at the University of Asia and the Pacific.

Lopez has previously worked as a researcher and writer for the Cultural Center of the Philippines (CCP), the local auction house León Gallery Fine Art and Antiques, and has worked previously as the Museum Registrar and Consultant to Fundacion Sansó. Presently, he serves as the Digital Content Manager of Vintage Grail, a regional watch company with offices in Hong Kong and Manila that specialize in sourcing extremely rare vintage timepieces and highly coveted modern watches.

He has written numerous articles on Philippine art, history, and culture in various publications. His articles on the life of historian and curator Ramon Villegas and the political history of the Cebuano people have been included in the second edition of the CCP Encyclopedia of Philippine Art in 2017. 

A collector of fine wristwatches, Lopez contributed to the second edition of the horological publication The Watch Annual, a comprehensive guide to all featured watches released in that year being its sole representative for the Philippines.

Bibliography 
Contributor in Books and Other Publications
 Ramon Villegas (2017, CCP Encyclopedia of Philippine Art) 
 Cebuano (2017, CCP Encyclopedia of Philippine Art) (co-authored with Resil B. Mojares, Monica P. Consing, John Bengan and edited by Nicanor G. Tiongson)
 The Watch Annual 2021 (2021) (edited by Justin Hast)

References

1993 births
Filipino art historians
Writers from Manila
University of Asia and the Pacific alumni
Filipino curators
Living people